The United States Coast Guard's ratings are general occupations that consist of specific skills and abilities. Each rating has its own specialty badge, which is typically worn on the left sleeve of their service dress uniform by enlisted personnel in that particular field. On operational dress uniforms, they wear generic rate designators that exclude the rating symbol. Commissioned officers do not have ratings. U.S. Coast Guard ratings are the equivalent of the rating system used by the United States Navy, known as Navy Enlistment Classification (NEC) codes. The United States Army and United States Marine Corps use Military Occupational Specialty (MOS) codes and the United States Air Force use Air Force Specialty Codes (AFSC) that service the same function as U.S. Coast Guard and U.S. Navy ratings.

Ratings should not be confused with "rates", which describe the Navy's and Coast Guard's enlisted pay-grades.  Enlisted Navy and Coast Guardsmen are referred to by their rating and rate. For example, if someone's rate is Petty Officer 2nd Class and his rating is Boatswain's Mate; when combined, Boatswain's Mate 2nd Class (BM2) defines both. Although rates E-7 above are abbreviated similar to E-4 to E-6, the combined rating is listed before rate when completely spelled out. For instance, Master Chief Electronics Technician is abbreviated as ETCM. More examples are listed in the table below.

Aviation group

Administrative and scientific group

Deck & weapons group

Engineering & hull group

Reserve specific group

Command group

Obsolete ratings (1983-Present)

See also
List of United States Coast Guard enlisted ranks
United States Coast Guard officer rank insignia
Badges of the United States Coast Guard
Obsolete badges of the United States military
List of United States Navy ratings
List of United States Army careers
List of United States Marine Corps MOS
List of United States Navy staff corps
Air Force Specialty Code

References
 This article incorporates text in the public domain from the United States Coast Guard.
 U.S. Coast Guard Uniform Regulations COMDTINST M1020.6I, dated May 2016

External links
 USCG Ratings
 USCG and USCG Reserve, "Born Ready"

Ratings list
United States military specialisms